Kiprono is a masculine given name of  Kalenjin origin. The name indicates that the bearer was born near dusk as sheep and goats returned from grazing ("rot nego"), usually around 5 to 6 p.m. It is related to the name "Kiprotich." The feminine equivalent is Jerono or Cherono .

Notable People

Politicians
Henry Kiprono Kosgey, Kenyan politician for Orange Democratic Movement
Isaac Ruto, Kenyan politician for the United Republican Party
Kipkalya Kiprono Kones (1952–2008), Kenyan politician for the Orange Democratic Movement and former government minister
Kiprono Langat, Kenyan politician for the Orange Democratic Movement
Kipyator Nicholas Kiprono arap Biwott (born 1940), Kenyan businessman and politician
Moses Kiprono arap Keino (1937–1998), Kenyan politician and Speaker of the Parliament of Kenya

Runners
Augustine Kiprono Choge (born 1987), Kenyan long-distance track runner and 2006 Commonwealth Games champion
Elijah Kiprono Kemboi (born 1984), Kenyan marathon runner and 2011 Košice Marathon winner
Emmanuel Kiprono Kipsang (born 1991), Kenyan long-distance track runner
Geoffrey Kiprono Mutai (born 1981), Kenyan marathon runner and former Boston Marathon and New York Marathon champion
Gladys Cherono Kiprono (born 1983), Kenyan long-distance track runner and two-time African champion
Henry Kiprono Kirwa, Kenyan Paralympic runner and three-time Paralympic champion
Isaac Kiprono Songok (born 1984), Kenyan cross country runner and two-time World Championships medallist
Josephat Kiprono (born 1973), Kenyan marathon runner and winner of the 1999 Berlin Marathon
Josphat Kiprono Menjo (born 1979), Kenyan long-distance track and road runner
Noah Kiprono Ngeny (born 1978), Kenyan 1500 metres runner and 2000 Olympic champion
Philip Kiprono Langat (born 1990), Kenyan long-distance road runner
Robert Kiprono Cheruiyot (born 1988), Kenyan marathon runner and winner of the 2010 Boston Marathon

Scientists
Richard Kiprono Mibey, Kenyan biologist, mycologist and university administrator

See also
Rono (disambiguation)
Kip Rono (born 1958), Kenyan steeplechase runner

Kalenjin names